Calophyllum thwaitesii is a species of flowering plant in the Calophyllaceae family. It is found only in Sri Lanka.

Culture
Known as බ‍ටු කින ( batu kina ) in Sinhala.

References

thwaitesii
Flora of Sri Lanka
Vulnerable plants
Taxonomy articles created by Polbot